A dynamic hydrogen electrode (DHE) is a reference electrode, more specific a subtype of the standard hydrogen electrodes for electrochemical processes by simulating a reversible hydrogen electrode with an approximately 20 to 40 mV more negative potential.

Principle
A separator in a glass tube connects two electrolytes and a small current is enforced between the cathode and anode.

Applications
 In-situ reference electrode for direct methanol fuel cells
 Proton exchange membrane fuel cells

See also
Palladium-hydrogen electrode

References

Electrodes
Hydrogen technologies